Holly Ann Brink (née Hynick; born July 18, 1982), is an American politician from the state of Iowa.

Brink was born in Keokuk County, Iowa in 1982. She resides with her family in Oskaloosa, Iowa.

Brink announced in December 2021 that she would not seek re-election following the completion of her term.

Electoral history
*incumbent

2018

2020

References

Living people
1982 births
Republican Party members of the Iowa House of Representatives
21st-century American politicians